In Flight is the first solo album by singer and producer Linda Perry. The album was released in 1996 and was produced by Bill Bottrell. Perry re-released the album in 2005 on her own record label, Custard Records. It was released on CD and vinyl and re-released on streaming platforms. The release contains original videos for the singles "Freeway" and "Fill Me Up".

Songs
In Flight was described by Perry as "an audio diary" inspired by Pink Floyd's The Dark Side of the Moon  She said she would have made it during her time as a member of 4 Non Blondes, but she "didn't have enough influence in the band". Songs such as "In My Dreams" and "Too Deep" were written during her time in the band, but not recorded. The album was intended to create an "atmosphere for visualization in the mind."

"Knock Me Out" was featured on the soundtrack of the film The Crow: City of Angels. Its melody was used by Ukrainian singer Alyosha for her entry in the Eurovision Song Contest in 2010, leading to allegations that her song "To Be Free" was plagiarized.

Critical reception
Vincent Jeffrey, from AllMusic, proclaimed the album as "Both subtle and bombastic, sweet and aggressive, and intellectually and sonically challenging." He also said "There are a couple overly personal moments within the In Flight playlist, like the opener 'In My Dreams,' but Perry leans on her expressive vocals to keep the dangerously sincere material interesting."

Larry Cook, also from AllMusic, wrote, "She does not show off with powerhouse vocals as much as her earlier album with 4 Non-Blondes, but rather displays a softer tone on many of these songs while maintaining the unique sound of her voice.  In Flight is a bit moody and somewhat creepy, which isn't a bad thing at all."

Track listing

Music videos
"Fill Me Up" (Music Video) – 4:44
"Freeway" (Music Video) – 4:35

Personnel
 Linda Perry – vocals, guitars, piano, bass
 Bill Bottrell – guitars, bass, drums
 Kevin Gilbert – keyboards, guitars
 Dan Schwartz – bass, steel guitar
 Brian MacLeod – drums, percussion
 Lisa Germano – violin (appears courtesy of 4AD Records)

Additional personnel
 Grace Slick – vocals on "Knock Me Out"

Production
 Bill Bottrell – producer
 Linda Perry – co-producer
 Blair Lamb and Mark Cross – engineers
 Recorded at Toad Hall
 Mastered by Joe Gastwirt
 Jill Rose – project coordination

Charts

References

External links
 

1996 debut albums
Albums produced by Bill Bottrell
Albums produced by Linda Perry
Interscope Records albums